Urophora dzieduszyckii is a species of tephritid or fruit flies in the genus Urophora of the family Tephritidae.

Distribution
Ukraine.

References

Urophora
Insects described in 1867
Diptera of Europe
Taxa named by Georg Ritter von Frauenfeld